Melgar de Abajo is a municipality located in the province of Valladolid, Castile and León, Spain. According to the 2010 census (INE), the municipality has a population of 145 inhabitants.

Demography

References

Municipalities in the Province of Valladolid